Gilt edge or Gilt Edge may refer to:

Gilding, the decorative technique
Gilt Edge, Tennessee
Gilt Edge, Alberta
Gilt Edge, Nevada, now Atwood
Gilt-edged tanager
Gilt-edged securities